Danielle Smith (born 29 April 1990 in Grande Prairie, Alberta) is a Canadian female volleyball player. She was part of the Canada women's national volleyball team, and participated at the 2017 FIVB Volleyball Women's World Grand Prix, and 2018 FIVB Volleyball Women's World Championship. She played for five years for the VIU Mariners of the Canadian Collegiate Athletic Association where she won a national championship in 2012.

On a club level she plays for CSM Targoviste.

References

External links 
 FIVB profile
 Olympic profile

1995 births
Living people
Canadian women's volleyball players
Setters (volleyball)